Under the Knife may refer to:

Film and television
Under the Knife (film), a 2019 British documentary
"Under the Knife" (Gotham), a television episode
Louis Theroux: Under the Knife, a television documentary by Louis Theroux

Music
Under the Knife (EP) an EP by Hatebreed
"Under the Knife", a song by Exhumed from Anatomy Is Destiny
"Under the Knife", a song by Kansas from Freaks of Nature
"Under the Knife", a song by Labrinth from Atomic
"Under the Knife", a song by Motörhead, B-side of "Killed by Death"
"Under the Knife", a song by Rise Against from The Sufferer & the Witness

Other uses
Trauma Center: Under the Knife, a Nintendo DS video game
Under the Knife, a book by Krista Franklin
"Under the Knife", a short story by H. G. Wells included in his collection The Plattner Story and Others
"Under the Knife", a Baseball Prospectus column by Will Carroll
Witch Doctor Vol. 1: Under the Knife, a collection of Witch Doctor comics